Sedgwick is a civil parish in the South Lakeland District of Cumbria, England. It contains five listed buildings that are recorded in the National Heritage List for England.  All the listed buildings are designated at Grade II, the lowest of the three grades, which is applied to "buildings of national importance and special interest".  The parish contains the village of Sedgwick and the surrounding countryside.  The Lancaster Canal passed through the parish, but it now dry in this area; There are two listed buildings associated with it, an aqueduct and a bridge.  The other listed buildings are a farmhouse, and a former country house and its gatehouse.


Buildings

References

Citations

Sources

Lists of listed buildings in Cumbria